Carle may refer to:

Carle, a surname
Carle (given name)

See also

Carl (disambiguation)